Dr. Basawaraj Jawali is an Indian politician of the Indian National Congress. He served as the Member of Parliament (MP) 2 times, represented the Gulbarga in Lok Sabha the lower house of the Indian Parliament. He also served as a Principal of M.R. Medical College in Gulbarga, President of H.K. Education Society of Gulbarga, Secretary of Rotary Club, Vice-President of Indian Medical Association in Gulbarga, Member of Post Graduate Institute of Medical Education and Research - Chandigarh, since 5 April 1990.

Early life and background 
Basawaraj Jawali was born on 6 October 1937 in Aland, Karnataka. Gurushantappa was his father. He completed his education from Karnataka Medical College in Hubli (Karnataka).

Personal life 
Dr. Jawali married Lalitha B. Jawali on 14 May 1965. The couple has one son and two daughters.

Political career 
Dr. Jawali was first elected to 9th Lok Sabha in 1989 from Gulbarga. He was re-elected  10th Lok Sabha in 1991.

Position held 

 Principal - M.R. Medical College, Gulbarga.
 President - H.K. Education Society, Gulbarga.
 Secretary - Rotary Club.
 Vice-President - Indian Medical Association, Gulbarga.
 Member - Post Graduate Institute of Medical Education and Research, Chandigarh since 5 April 1990.

References

External links
Official biographical sketch in Parliament of India website

1937 births
India MPs 1991–1996
Lok Sabha members from Karnataka
Living people
Karnataka politicians
India MPs 1989–1991
Indian National Congress politicians from Karnataka
Kannada people
People from Kalaburagi
People from Kalaburagi district
People from Karnataka